William Charles Francis (4 February 1894 – 28 November 1981) was a New Zealand rugby union player. A hooker, Francis represented Wellington at a provincial level, and was a member of the New Zealand national side, the All Blacks, in 1913 and 1914. He played 12 matches for the All Blacks including seven internationals.

Following the death of Richard Fogarty in 1980, Francis held the distinction of being the oldest living All Black.

References 

1894 births
1981 deaths
Rugby union players from New Plymouth
New Zealand rugby union players
New Zealand international rugby union players
Wellington rugby union players
Rugby union hookers